"The Real Thing" is a short story by Henry James, first syndicated by S. S. McClure in multiple American newspapers and then published in the British publication Black and White in April 1892 and the following year as the title story in the collection, The Real Thing and Other Stories published by Macmillan. This story, often read as a parable, plays with the reality-illusion dichotomy that fascinated James, especially in the later stages of his career. For the illustrator who narrates the story, the genuine article proves all too useless for his commercial purposes. The story  portrays the  unfortunate victims of a society in which reality and representation are closely intertwined in ways that make art a difficult project to disentangle the two.

Plot summary

The narrator, an unnamed illustrator and aspiring painter, hires a faded genteel couple, the Monarchs, as models, after they have lost most of their money and must find some line of work. They are the "real thing" in that they perfectly represent the aristocratic type, but they prove inflexible for the painter's work. He comes to rely much more on two lower-class subjects who are nevertheless more capable: Oronte, an Italian, and Miss Churm, a lower-class Englishwoman.

The illustrator finally has to get rid of the Monarchs, especially after his friend and fellow artist Jack Hawley criticizes the work in which the Monarchs are represented. Hawley says that the pair has hurt the narrator's art, perhaps permanently. In the final line of the story the narrator says he is "content to have paid the price—for the memory".

Major themes
James plays with the exact meaning of "the real thing" throughout the story's plot, which was suggested to him by George du Maurier. The Monarchs may be the real thing when it comes to country-house visits and drawing-room conversation, but Oronte and Miss Churm are just as much the genuine article for professional modeling. Late in the story the Monarchs desperately try to keep their jobs by actually becoming servants to the narrator, Miss Churm, and Oronte, in a superb example of Jamesian chiasmus.

Commentators have noted a bit of fantasy wish-fulfillment in the tale. The painter is hired to illustrate a series of novels by "the rarest of the novelists—who, long neglected by the multitudinous vulgar and dearly prized by the attentive (...) had had the happy fortune of seeing, late in life, the dawn and then the full light of a higher criticism—an estimate in which, on the part of the public, there was something really of expiation." James's own most laudatory criticism would come only posthumously.

Critical evaluation
Critics have generally praised what one of them called "one of James's neatest tales...important as poignant fiction, aesthetic parable, antiaristocratic satire, and sunken autobiography." That James was able to fit so complex a subject into under ten thousand words was a genuine triumph of his by now completely mature technique.

James does not make the parable into an arid demonstration of a debating point. The characters all come alive as fully individualized creations. The incompetent Monarchs are sympathetic, and the narrator himself is memorable for his increasingly desperate but ultimately futile attempts to help them.

References

 The Tales of Henry James by Edward Wagenknecht (New York: Frederick Ungar Publishing Co. 1984) 
 A Henry James Encyclopedia by Robert L. Gale (New York: Greenwood Press 1989) 
 Tales of Henry James: The Texts of the Tales, the Author on His Craft, Criticism. Eds. Christof Wegelin and Henry Wonham (New York: W.W. Norton & Company, 2003)

External links

 First book publication of "The Real Thing" (1893)
  Author's preface to the New York Edition text of "The Real Thing" (1909)
 Note on the texts of "The Real Thing" at the Library of America web site
 

Short stories by Henry James
1892 short stories
Works originally published in American newspapers
Short stories about artists